Hessischer Leseförderpreis is a literary prize of Hesse.

External links
 

Literary awards of Hesse